Ghoster Coaster (formerly Scooby's Gasping Ghoster Coaster), is a junior wooden roller coaster located at Canada's Wonderland whose name was shortened to just "Ghoster Coaster" for the 2010 season, as part of the transition to Planet Snoopy.

Ghoster Coaster opened, along with the entire park, on May 23, 1981, as one of the five original roller coasters to open with the park. The other four were Dragon Fyre, Thunder Run, the Wilde Beast, and the Mighty Canadian Minebuster. All three wooden coasters were designed by Curtis D. Summers and built in-house by the Taft Broadcasting Company. Some sources claim Philadelphia Toboggan Company (PTC) built these coasters, but PTC stopped building coasters in 1979.

Ghoster Coaster was awarded ACE Coaster Classic status, but that status has since been rescinded as a result of recent changes to the coaster.

References

External links 
Official Ghoster Coaster page
Ghoster Coaster at PCW Junkies

Canada's Wonderland
Family roller coasters
Roller coasters in Ontario
Roller coasters introduced in 1981
Roller coasters operated by Cedar Fair